Dionay is a former commune in the Isère department in southeastern France. On 31 December 2015, it was merged into the new commune of Saint-Antoine-l'Abbaye.

Population

Twin towns
Dionay is twinned with:

  Sermoneta, Italy, since 2007

See also
Communes of the Isère department

References

Former communes of Isère
Isère communes articles needing translation from French Wikipedia